Proto-Indo-European pronouns have been reconstructed by modern linguists, based on similarities found across all Indo-European languages. This article lists and discusses the hypothesised forms.

Proto-Indo-European (PIE) pronouns, especially demonstrative pronouns, are difficult to reconstruct because of their variety in later languages.

Grammatical categories
PIE pronouns inflected for case and number, and partly for gender. For more information on these categories, see the article on Proto-Indo-European nominals.

Personal pronouns
PIE had personal pronouns in the first and second person, but not the third person, where demonstratives were used instead. They were inflected for case and number (singular, dual, and plural), but not for gender. The personal pronouns had their own unique forms and endings, and some had two distinct stems; this is most obvious in the first person singular, where the two stems are still preserved, as for instance in English I and me. There were also two varieties for the accusative, genitive and dative cases, a stressed and an enclitic form. Many of the special pronominal endings were later borrowed as nominal endings.

The following tables give the paradigms as reconstructed by Beekes and by Sihler.

Other reconstructions typically differ only slightly from Beekes and Sihler (see for example Fortson 2004).

Demonstrative pronouns
He gives the following paradigms:

Beekes also postulates three adverbial particles, from which demonstratives were constructed in various later languages:
 "here" (reconstructed as a demonstrative  "this" by Fortson
 "there" and
 "away, again",

Reflexive pronoun
A third-person reflexive pronoun , parallel to the first and second person singular personal pronouns, also existed, though it lacked a nominative form:

Relative pronoun
PIE had a relative pronoun with the stem .

Interrogative/indefinite pronoun
There was also a pronoun with the stem  (adjectival ) used both as an interrogative and an indefinite pronoun.

Pronominal adjectives
Proto-Indo-European possessed few adjectives that had a distinct set of endings, identical to those of the demonstrative pronoun above but differing from those of regular adjectives. They included at least  "other, another" (or ?).

Reflexes

Reflexes, or descendants of the PIE reconstructed forms in its daughter languages, include the following.

In the following languages, two reflexes separated by a slash mean:
 English: Old English / Modern English
 German: Old High German / New High German
 Irish: Old Irish / Modern Irish
 Persian: Old Persian / Modern Persian
 Tocharian: Tocharian A / Tocharian B

Notes

References

External links

Pronoun
Pronouns by language